Carlo Molfetta (born 15 February 1984 in Mesagne) is a taekwondo athlete from Italy, who won gold at the 2012 London Olympics in the men's +80 kg division, beating Gabon's Anthony Obame. Molfetta was determined to be the victor after the bout concluded in a 9-9 tie, with the judges ruling that Molfetta had won based upon superiority.

Biography
He also won the Gold Medal in the 2010 European Taekwondo Championships.

References

External links
 
 Carlo Molfetta Website
 

1984 births
Italian male taekwondo practitioners
Taekwondo practitioners at the 2004 Summer Olympics
Taekwondo practitioners at the 2012 Summer Olympics
Living people
Olympic gold medalists for Italy
Olympic taekwondo practitioners of Italy
Olympic medalists in taekwondo
Medalists at the 2012 Summer Olympics
Universiade medalists in taekwondo
Universiade gold medalists for Italy
Taekwondo practitioners of Centro Sportivo Carabinieri
European Taekwondo Championships medalists
World Taekwondo Championships medalists
Medalists at the 2003 Summer Universiade
21st-century Italian people